The 2010 Cleveland Indians season marked the 110th season for the franchise, with the Indians attempting to improve on their fourth-place finish in the AL Central in 2009. The team played all of its home games at Progressive Field. In addition, this was the second season for the Indians playing their spring training games in Goodyear, Arizona. Manny Acta took over as the manager in 2010, after the Indians fired Eric Wedge at the end of his seventh season managing the Indians. Acta was formerly the manager of the Washington Nationals. Fausto Carmona represented the team at the 2010 Major League Baseball All-Star Game.

Regular season

Galarraga Game

On June 2, Detroit's Armando Galarraga squared off against Roberto Hernandez. Neither pitcher would walk a batter that night. In the bottom of the 2nd inning, Miguel Cabrera homered giving the Tigers a 1-0 lead. Until the bottom of the 8th, that would be the game's only run. With 2 outs, Magglio Ordonez drove in Austin Jackson, making it 2-0 and a throwing error by Shin-Soo Choo allowed Johnny Damon to follow, making it 3-0. Galarraga retired the first 26 Indians. In the top of the 9th, Jackson preserved the bid for perfection with a stellar over-the-shoulder catch off the bat of Mark Grudzielanek. With 2 outs, Jason Donald hit a soft groundball to the right side of the infield. The play at first base was very close, but the 1st base umpire and crew chief Jim Joyce ruled Donald safe. However, the replay showed that Donald was out by a step. Donald would steal 2nd and 3rd on defensive indifference. Trevor Crowe was the final out of the game.

Trade deadline moves
For the third consecutive year, the Indians were significant participants in trade deadline moves.  
Jhonny Peralta went first, three days before the deadline.  Austin Kearns went the night before, while pitchers Jake Westbrook and Kerry Wood were shipped in two separate trades hours before the July 31 deadline.

On July 28, Peralta and cash were sent to the Detroit Tigers for Class A left-handed pitcher Giovanni Soto. Luis Valbuena was recalled from Triple-A Columbus to take Peralta's roster spot.

On July 30, Kearns was sent to the New York Yankees for a player to be named later.

On July 31, Westbrook was part of a three-team trade involving the Indians, St. Louis Cardinals, and San Diego Padres. He went to the Cardinals, while the Indians received Class AA right-handed pitcher Corey Kluber from San Diego.   Later in the day, the Tribe sent Wood and cash to the New York Yankees for a player to be named or cash.

Season standings

Roster

Game log 

|- style="text-align:center; background:#ffcccc;"
| 1 || April 5 || @ White Sox || 6-0 || Buehrle (1–0) || Westbrook (0–1) ||  || 38,935 || 0–1
|- style="text-align:center; background:#bbffbb;"
| 2 || April 7 || @ White Sox ||  5–3 || Carmona (1–0) || Williams (0–1) || Perez (1) || 19,514 || 1–1
|- style="text-align:center; background:#bbffbb;"
| 3 || April 8 || @ White Sox ||  5–3 (11) || Lewis (1–0) || Putz (0–1) || Perez (2) || 18,637 || 2–1
|- style="text-align:center; background:#ffcccc;"
| 4 || April 9 || @ Tigers || 5-2 || Porcello (1–0) || Huff (0–1)|| Valverde (1) || 45,010 || 2–2
|- style="text-align:center; background:#ffcccc;"
| 5 || April 10 || @ Tigers || 4-2 || Bonderman (1–0) || Talbot (0–1) || Perry (1) || 35,332 || 2–3
|- style="text-align:center; background:#ffcccc;"
| 6 || April 11 || @ Tigers || 9-8 || Coke (1–0) || Perez (0–1)  ||   || 26,081 || 2–4
|- style="text-align:center; background:#ffcccc;"
| 7 || April 12 || Rangers || 4-2 (10) || Francisco (2–2) || Wright (0–1) || Feliz (1) || 42,061 || 2–5
|- style="text-align:center; background:#ffcccc;"
| 8 || April 14 || Rangers || 6-2 || Lewis (2–0) || Masterson (0–1) || Feliz (2) || 10,071 || 2–6
|- style="text-align:center; background:#bbffbb;"
| 9 || April 15 || Rangers || 3–2 || Huff (1–1) || Harrison (0–1) || || 10,198 || 3–6
|- style="text-align:center; background:#bbffbb;"
| 10 || April 16 || White Sox || 6–2 || Talbot (1–1) || Buehrle (2–1) || || 10,421 || 4–6
|- style="text-align:center;" bgcolor="#bbffbb"
| 11 || April 17 || White Sox || 3–2 || Lewis (2–0) || Thornton (1–1)|| Perez (3) || 12,885 || 5–6
|- style="text-align:center;" bgcolor="#bbffbb"
| 12 || April 18 || White Sox || 7–4 || Carmona (2–0) || Floyd (0–2) || Perez (4)  || 10,564 || 6–6
|- style="text-align:center;" bgcolor="#ffcccc"
| 13 || April 20 || @ Twins || 5-1 || Slowey (2–1) || Masterson (0–2) || || 38,985 || 6–7
|- style="text-align:center;" bgcolor="#ffcccc"
| 14 || April 21 || @ Twins || 6-0 || Liriano (2–0) || Huff (1–2) || || 39,044 || 6–8
|- style="text-align:center;" bgcolor="#bbffbb"
| 15 || April 22 || @ Twins || 8–1 || Talbot (2–1) || Baker (2–2) || || 38,810 || 7–8
|- style="text-align:center;" bgcolor="#ffcccc"
| 16 || April 23 || @ Athletics || 10-0 || Duchscherer (2–0) || Westbrook (0–2)|| || 11,547 || 7–9
|- style="text-align:center;" bgcolor="#bbffbb"
| 17 || April 24 || @ Athletics || 6–1 || Carmona (3–0) || Gaudin (0–2) || || 15,873 || 8–9
|- style="text-align:center;" bgcolor="#ffcccc"
| 18 || April 25 || @ Athletics || 11-0 || Gonzalez (2–1) || Masterson (0–3) || || 16,946 || 8–10
|- style="text-align:center;" bgcolor="#ffcccc"
| 19 || April 26 || @ Angels || 5-2 || Weaver (3–0) || Huff (1–3) || Fuentes (3) || 34,837 || 8–11
|- style="text-align:center;" bgcolor="#bbffbb"
| 20 || April 27 || @ Angels || 9–2 || Talbot (3–1) || Saunders (1–4) || || 39,619 || 9–11
|- style="text-align:center;" bgcolor="#ffcccc"
| 21 || April 28 || @ Angels || 4-3 || Fuentes (1–1) || Smith (0–1) || || 34,190 || 9–12
|- style="text-align:center;" bgcolor="#ffcccc"
| 22 || April 30 || Twins || 9–3 || Slowey (3–2)|| Carmona (3–1) || || 14,124 || 9–13
|-

|- style="text-align:center;" bgcolor="#bbffbb"
| 23 || May 1 || Twins || 5–4 (11) || Wright (1–1) || Burnett (0–1) || || 13,832 || 10–13
|- style="text-align:center;" bgcolor="#ffcccc"
| 24 || May 2 || Twins || 8–3 || Liriano (4–0) || Huff (1–4) || || 12,619 || 10–14
|- style="text-align:center;" bgcolor="#ffcccc"
| 25 || May 3 || Blue Jays || 5–1 || Cecil (2–1) || Talbot (3–2) || || 10,117 || 10–15
|- style="text-align:center;" bgcolor="#ffcccc"
| 26 || May 4 || Blue Jays || 8–5 || Romero (3–1) || Lewis (2–1) || Gregg (7) || 10,387 || 10–16
|- style="text-align:center;" bgcolor="#ffcccc"
| 27 || May 5 || Blue Jays || 5–4 || Frasor (1–1) || Perez (0–2) || || 12,563 || 10–17
|- style="text-align:center;" bgcolor="#bbbbbb"
| N/A || May 7 || Tigers || colspan=6 | Postponed (rain)
|- style="text-align:center;" bgcolor="#ffcccc"
| 28 || May 8 || Tigers || 6–4 || Verlander (3–2) || Wood (0–1) || Valverde (8) || 18,428 || 10–18
|- style="text-align:center;" bgcolor="#bbffbb"
| 29 || May 9 || Tigers || 7–4 ||Talbot (4–2) || Scherzer (1–3) || Pérez (5) || 16,980 || 11–18
|- style="text-align:center;" bgcolor="#bbffbb"
| 30 || May 11 || @ Royals || 8–2 || Westbrook (1–2)|| Bannister (1–3) || || 15,930 || 12–18
|- style="text-align:center;" bgcolor="#bbffbb"
| 31 || May 12 || @ Royals || 4–0 || Carmona (4–1)|| Davies (2–2) || || 11,803 || 13–18
|- style="text-align:center;" bgcolor="#ffcccc"
| 32 || May 13 || @ Royals || 6-4 || Greinke (1–4) || Huff (1–5) || Soria (8) || 28,361 || 13–19
|- style="text-align:center;" bgcolor="#ffcccc"
| 33 || May 14 || @ Orioles || 8-1 || Guthrie (2–4) || Masterson (0–4) || || 25,902 || 13–20
|- style="text-align:center;" bgcolor="#bbffbb"
| 34 || May 15 || @ Orioles || 8–2 || Talbot (5–2) || Simón (0–1) || || 29,545 || 14–20
|- style="text-align:center;" bgcolor="#bbffbb"
| 35 || May 16 || @ Orioles || 5–1 || Westbrook (2–2) || Hendrickson (1–1) || || 29,323 || 15–20
|- style="text-align:center;" bgcolor="#ffcccc"
| 36 || May 17 || @ Rays || 4-3 || Sonnanstine (1–0) || Wright (1–2) || || 18,879 || 15–21
|- style="text-align:center;" bgcolor="#ffcccc"
| 37 || May 18 || @ Rays || 6-2 || Price (6–1) ||Huff (1–6) || || 17,093 || 15–22
|- style="text-align:center;" bgcolor="#ffcccc"
| 38 || May 19 || Royals || 8-4 || Chen (1–0) || Wood (0–2)|| || 10,916 || 15–23
|- style="text-align:center;" bgcolor="#ffcccc"
| 39 || May 20 || Royals || 9-3 || Hochevar (4–2) || Talbot (5–3) || || 13,953 || 15–24
|- style="text-align:center;" bgcolor="#ffcccc"
| 40 || May 21 || Reds || 7-4 || Arroyo (4–2) || Laffey (0–1) || Cordero (14)|| 23,028 || 15–25
|- style="text-align:center;" bgcolor="#ffcccc"
| 41 || May 22 || Reds || 6-4 || Cueto (4–1) || Carmona (4–2) || || 25,531 || 15–26
|- style="text-align:center;" bgcolor="#bbffbb"
| 42 || May 23 || Reds || 4–3 || Huff (4–2) || Herrera (0–2) || Wood (1) || 21,044 || 16–26
|- style="text-align:center;" bgcolor="#ffcccc"
| 43 || May 24 || White Sox || 7-2 || Danks (4–3) || Masterson (0–5) || || 10,166 || 16–27
|- style="text-align:center;" bgcolor="#bbffbb"
| 44 || May 25 || White Sox || 7–3 || Talbot (6–3) || Peavy (3–4) || || 14,441 || 17–27
|- style="text-align:center;" bgcolor="#ffcccc"
| 45 || May 26 || White Sox || 5-4 || Peña (1–1) || Westbrook (2–3) ||  || 18,109 || 17–28
|- style="text-align:center;" bgcolor="#ffcccc"
| 46 || May 28 || @ Yankees || 8-2 || Hughes (6–1) || Carmona (4–3) || || 44,634 || 17–29
|- style="text-align:center;" bgcolor="#bbffbb"
| 47 || May 29 || @ Yankees || 13–11 || Pérez (1–0) || Chamberlain (1–3) || Wood (2) || 46,599 || 18–29
|- style="text-align:center;" bgcolor="#ffcccc"
| 48 || May 30 || @ Yankees || 7-3 || Burnett (6–2) || Sipp (0–1) || || 45,706 || 18–30
|- style="text-align:center;" bgcolor="#ffcccc"
| 49 || May 31 || @ Yankees || 11-2 || Pettitte (7–1) || Talbot (6–4) || || 44,976 || 18–31
|-

|- style="text-align:center;" bgcolor="#bbffbb"
| 50 || June 1 || @ Tigers || 3–2 || Westbrook (3–3) || Bonderman (2–3) || Wood (3) || 19,446 || 19–31
|- style="text-align:center;" bgcolor="#ffcccc"
| 51 || June 2 || @ Tigers || 3-0 || Galarraga (2–1) || Carmona (4–4) || || 17,738 || 19–32
|- style="text-align:center;" bgcolor="#ffcccc"
| 52 || June 3 || @ Tigers || 12-6 || Thomas (2–0) || Ambriz (0–1) || || 28,169 || 19–33
|- style="text-align:center;" bgcolor="#bbffbb"
| 53 || June 4 || @ White Sox || 10–1 || Masterson (1–5) || Danks (4–5) || || 20,713 || 20–33
|- style="text-align:center;" bgcolor="#bbffbb"
| 54 || June 5 || @ White Sox || 3–1 || Talbot (7–4) || Peavy (4–5) || Wood (4) || 30,864 || 21–33
|- style="text-align:center;" bgcolor="#ffcccc"
| 55 || June 6 || @ White Sox || 8-7 || Putz (1–2) || Sipp (0–2) || Jenks (9) || 27,577 || 21–34
|- style="text-align:center;" bgcolor="#ffcccc"
| 56 || June 7 || Red Sox || 4-1 || Matsuzaka (5–2) || Carmona (4–5) ||  || 14,758 || 21–35
|- style="text-align:center;" bgcolor="#ffcccc"
| 57 || June 8 || Red Sox || 3-2 || Wakefield (2–4) || Huff (2–7) || Bard (2) || 15,462 || 21–36
|- style="text-align:center;" bgcolor="#bbffbb"
| 58 || June 9 || Red Sox || 11–0 || Masterson (2–5) || Buchholz (8–4) ||  || 14,022 || 22–36
|- style="text-align:center;" bgcolor="#bbffbb"
| 59 || June 10 || Red Sox || 8–7 || Wood (1–2) || Bard (1–2) ||  || 20,446 || 23–36
|- style="text-align:center;" bgcolor="#bbffbb"
| 60 || June 11 || Nationals || 7–2 || Westbrook (4–3) || Atilano (5–3) || Perez (6) || 22,041 || 24–36
|- style="text-align:center;" bgcolor="#bbffbb"
| 61 || June 12 || Nationals || 7–1 || Carmona (5–5) || Martin (0–2) ||  || 19,484 || 25–36
|- style="text-align:center;" bgcolor="#ffcccc"
| 62 || June 13 || Nationals || 9-4 || Strasburg (2–0) || Huff (2–8) ||  || 32,876 || 25–37
|- style="text-align:center;" bgcolor="#ffcccc"
| 63 || June 15 || Mets || 7-6 || Santana (5–3) || Masterson (2–6) || Rodríguez (14) || 12,882 || 25–38
|- style="text-align:center;" bgcolor="#ffcccc"
| 64 || June 16 || Mets || 8-4 || Niese (4–2) || Talbot (7–5) ||  || 14,246 || 25–39
|- style="text-align:center;" bgcolor="#ffcccc"
| 65 || June 17 || Mets || 6-4 || Dickey (5–0) || Westbrook (4–4) || Rodríguez (15) || 14,339 || 25–40
|- style="text-align:center;" bgcolor="#bbffbb"
| 66 || June 18 || @ Pirates || 4–3 || Carmona (6-5) || Maholm (4-5) || Wood (5) || 28,478 || 26–40
|- style="text-align:center;" bgcolor="#ffcccc"
| 67 || June 19 || @ Pirates || 6-4 || Karstens (2-2) || Huff (2-9) || Dotel (13) || 38,008 || 26–41
|- style="text-align:center;" bgcolor="#ffcccc"
| 68 || June 20 || @ Pirates || 5-3 || Donnelly (3–1) || Lewis (2-2) || Dotel (14) || 29,845 || 26–42
|- style="text-align:center;" bgcolor="#ffcccc"
| 69 || June 22 || @ Phillies || 2-1 || Moyer (8–6) || Talbot (7–6) || Lidge (5) || 44,836 || 26–43
|- style="text-align:center;" bgcolor="#ffcccc"
| 70 || June 23 || @ Phillies || 7-6 || Romero (1–0) || Wood (1–3) ||  || 44,510 || 26–44
|- style="text-align:center;" bgcolor="#ffcccc"
| 71 || June 24 || @ Phillies || 12-3 || Blanton (3–5) || Carmona (6–6) ||  || 45,085 || 26–45
|- style="text-align:center;" bgcolor="#ffcccc"
| 72 || June 25 || @ Reds || 10-3 || Harang (6–7) || Laffey (0–2) ||  || 32,844 || 26–46
|- style="text-align:center;" bgcolor="#ffcccc"
| 73 || June 26 || @ Reds || 6-4 || Herrera (1–3) || Masterson (2–7) || Cordero (20) || 37,757 || 26–47
|- style="text-align:center;" bgcolor="#bbffbb"
| 74 || June 27 || @ Reds || 5–3 || Talbot (8–6) || Arroyo (7–4) || Wood (6) || 25,877 || 27–47
|- style="text-align:center;" bgcolor="#bbffbb"
| 75 || June 28 || Blue Jays || 2–1 || Westbrook (5–4) || Romero (6–4) || Wood (7) || 11,577 || 28–47
|- style="text-align:center;" bgcolor="#bbffbb"
| 76 || June 29 || Blue Jays || 5–4 || Carmona (7–6) || Morrow (5–6) || Wood (8) || 11,401 || 29–47
|- style="text-align:center;" bgcolor="#bbffbb"
| 77 || June 30 || Blue Jays || 3–1 || Laffey (1–2) || Litsch (0–3) || Perez (7) || 12,109 || 30–47
|-

|- style="text-align:center;" bgcolor="#bbffbb"
| 78 || July 1 || Blue Jays || 6–1 || Masterson (3–7) || Marcum (7–4) || Herrmann (1) || 16,859 || 31–47
|- style="text-align:center;" bgcolor="#ffcccc"
| 79 || July 2 || Athletics || 3-0 || Gonzalez (7–5) || Talbot (8–7) || Bailey (16) || 18,629 || 31–48
|- style="text-align:center;" bgcolor="#bbffbb"
| 80 || July 3 || Athletics || 5–4 || Sipp (1–2) || Breslow (3–2) ||  || 25,483 || 32–48
|- style="text-align:center;" bgcolor="#ffcccc"
| 81 || July 4 || Athletics || 3-1 || Mazzaro (4-2) || Carmona (7–7) || Bailey (17) || 13,940 || 32–49
|- style="text-align:center;" bgcolor="#bbffbb"
| 82 || July 5 || @ Rangers || 9–3 || Smith (1–1) || Beltre (0–1) ||  || 25,165 || 33–49
|- style="text-align:center;" bgcolor="#ffcccc"
| 83 || July 6 || @ Rangers || 12-1 || Wilson (7–4) || Masterson (3–8) ||  || 20,428 || 33–50
|- style="text-align:center;" bgcolor="#ffcccc"
| 84 || July 7 || @ Rangers || 4-3 || Lewis (8–5) || Talbot (8–8) || Feliz (23) || 24,427 || 33–51
|- style="text-align:center;" bgcolor="#ffcccc"
| 85 || July 8 || @ Rays || 5-2 || Davis (6–9) || Westbrook (5–5) || Wheeler (1) || 16,892 || 33–52
|- style="text-align:center;" bgcolor="#bbffbb"
| 86 || July 9 || @ Rays || 9–3 || Carmona (8–7) || Shields (7–9) ||  || 23,116 || 34–52
|- style="text-align:center;" bgcolor="#ffcccc"
| 87 || July 10 || @ Rays || 4-0 || Garza (10–5) || Laffey (1–3) ||  || 20,091 || 34–53
|- style="text-align:center;" bgcolor="#ffcccc"
| 88 || July 11 || @ Rays || 6-5 || Sonnanstine (2–0) || Wood (1–4) ||  || 24,687 || 34–54
|- style="text-align:center;" bgcolor="#bbffbb"
| 89 || July 16 || Tigers || 8–2 || Westbrook (6–5) || Scherzer (6–7) ||  || 22,295 || 35–54
|- style="text-align:center;" bgcolor="#bbffbb"
| 90 || July 17 || Tigers || 4–3 || Carmona (9–7) || Coke (5–1) || Perez (8) || 20,090 || 36–54
|- style="text-align:center;" bgcolor="#bbffbb"
| 91 || July 17 || Tigers || 2–1 || Pérez (2–0) || Weinhardt (0–1) ||  || 20,902 || 37–54
|- style="text-align:center;" bgcolor="#bbffbb"
| 92 || July 18 || Tigers || 7–2 || Gómez (1–0) || Oliver (0–4) ||  || 19,102 || 38–54
|- style="text-align:center;" bgcolor="#bbffbb"
| 93 || July 19 || @ Twins || 10–4 || Laffey (2–3) || Baker (7–8) ||  || 40,853 || 39–54
|- style="text-align:center;" bgcolor="#bbffbb"
| 94 || July 20 || @ Twins || 4–3 || Pérez (3–0) || Mijares (1–1) || Perez (9) || 40,745 || 40–54
|- style="text-align:center;" bgcolor="#ffcccc"
| 95 || July 21 || @ Twins || 6-0 || Liriano (8–7) || Westbrook (6-6) ||  || 40,799 || 40–55
|- style="text-align:center;" bgcolor="#bbffbb"
| 96 || July 23 || Rays || 3-1 || Carmona (10-7) || Niemann (8-3) || Sipp (1) || 16,904 || 41-55
|- style="text-align:center;" bgcolor="#ffcccc"
| 97 || July 24 || Rays || 6-3 || Price (13-5) || Talbot (8-9) || Soriano (25) || 17,221 || 41-56
|- style="text-align:center;" bgcolor="#ffcccc"
| 98 || July 25 || Rays || 4-2 || Davis (8-9) || Maserson (3-9) || Soriano (26) || 13,410 || 41-57
|- style="text-align:center;" bgcolor="#ffcccc"
| 99 || July 26 || Yankees || 3-2 || Vázquez (9-7) || Westbrook (6-7) || Rivera (21) || 27,224 || 41-58
|- style="text-align:center;" bgcolor="#bbffbb"
| 100 || July 27 || Yankees || 4-1 || Tomlin (1-0) || Sabathia (13-4) || Perez (10) || 27,416 || 42-58
|- style="text-align:center;" bgcolor="#ffcccc"
| 101 || July 28 || Yankees || 8-0 || Burnett (9-8) || Carmona (10-8) ||  || 22,965 || 42-59
|- style="text-align:center;" bgcolor="#ffcccc"
| 102 || July 29 || Yankees || 11-4 || Moseley (1-0) || Herrmann (0-1) ||  || 34,455 || 42-60
|- style="text-align:center;" bgcolor="#ffcccc"
| 103 || July 30 || @ Blue Jays || 8-1 || Marcum (10-4) || Masterson (3-10) || || 20,228 || 42-61
|- style="text-align:center;" bgcolor="#bbffbb"
| 104 || July 31 || @ Blue Jays || 2-1 || Lewis (3-2) || Tallet (1-4) || Perez (11) || 22,663 || 43-61
|-

|- style="text-align:center;" bgcolor="#bbffbb"
| 105 || August 1 || @ Blue Jays || 5-4 || Gómez (2-0) || Litsch (1-5) || Perez (12) || 21,797 || 44-61
|- style="text-align:center;" bgcolor="#bbffbb"
| 106 || August 2 || @ Red Sox || 6-5 || Carmona (11-8) || Lackey (10-6) || Perez (13) || 37,931 || 45-61
|- style="text-align:center;" bgcolor="#ffcccc"
| 107 || August 3 || @ Red Sox || 3-1 || Beckett (3-1) || Huff (2-10) || Papelbon (25) || 37,714 || 45-62
|- style="text-align:center;" bgcolor="#bbffbb"
| 108 || August 4 || @ Red Sox || 9-1 || Masterson (4-10) || Lester (11-7) || || 37,902 || 46-62
|- style="text-align:center;" bgcolor="#ffcccc"
| 109 || August 5 || @ Red Sox || 6-2 || Matsuzaka (8-3) || Tomlin (1-1) || Papelbon (26) || 38,102 || 46-63
|- style="text-align:center;" bgcolor="#bbffbb"
| 110 || August 6 || Twins || 7-6 || Perez (1-2) || Guerrier (2-7) || || 25,275 || 47-63
|- style="text-align:center;" bgcolor="#ffcccc"
| 111 || August 7 || Twins || 7-2 || Pavano (14-7) || Carmona (11-9) || || 27,638 || 47-64
|- style="text-align:center;" bgcolor="#ffcccc"
| 112 || August 8 || Twins || 5-4 || Duensing (5-1) || Huff (2-11) || Capps (28) || 17,427 || 47-65
|- style="text-align:center;" bgcolor="#ffcccc"
| 113 || August 10 || Orioles || 14-8 || Arrieta (4-3) || Masterson (4-11) || || 13,541 || 47-66
|- style="text-align:center;" bgcolor="#ffcccc"
| 114 || August 11 || Orioles || 3-1 || Bergesen (4-9) || Tomlin (1-2) || || 11,155 || 47-67
|- style="text-align:center;" bgcolor="#bbffbb"
| 115 || August 12 || Orioles || 4-1 || Gómez (3-0) || Millwood (2-12) || Perez (14) || 14,533 || 48-67
|- style="text-align:center;" bgcolor="#ffcccc"
| 116 || August 13 || Mariners || 3-2 || Pauley (1-4) || Carmona (11-10) || Aardsma (23) || 26,424 || 48-68
|- style="text-align:center;" bgcolor="#ffcccc"
| 117 || August 14 || Mariners || 9-3 || Vargas (9-5) || Talbot (8-10) || || 25,980 || 48-69
|- style="text-align:center;" bgcolor="#bbffbb"
| 118 || August 15 || Mariners || 9-1 || Sipp (2-2) || Hernández (8-10) || || 14,888 || 49-69
|- style="text-align:center;" bgcolor="#ffcccc"
| 119 || August 17 || @ Royals || 2-1 || Greinke (8-11) || Gómez (3-1) || Soria (34) || 13,258 || 49-70
|- style="text-align:center;" bgcolor="#ffcccc"
| 120 || August 18 || @ Royals || 9-7 || Chen (8-6) || Carmona (11-11) || Soria (35) || 12,864 || 49-71
|- style="text-align:center;" bgcolor="#bbffbb"
| 121 || August 19 || @ Royals || 7-3 || R. Perez (4-0) || Wood (1-3) || C. Perez (15) || 9,732 || 50-71
|- style="text-align:center;" bgcolor="#ffcccc"
| 122 || August 20 || @ Tigers || 6-0 || Galarraga (4-5) || Masterson (4-12) || || 33,936 || 50-72 
|- style="text-align:center;" bgcolor="#ffcccc"
| 123 || August 21 || @ Tigers || 5-2 || Scherzer (9-9) || Tomlin (1-3) || Valverde (24) || 38,088 || 50-73
|- style="text-align:center;" bgcolor="#ffcccc"
| 124 || August 22 || @ Tigers || 8-1 || Verlander (14-8) || Gómez (3-2) || || 35,104 || 50-74
|- style="text-align:center;" bgcolor="#ffcccc"
| 125 || August 24 || Athletics || 5-0 || Gonzalez (11-8) || Carmona (11-12) || || 11,751 || 50-75
|- style="text-align:center;" bgcolor="#ffcccc"
| 126 || August 25 || Athletics || 6-1 || Cahill (14-5) || Talbot (8-11) || || 10,514 || 50-76
|- style="text-align:center;" bgcolor="#bbffbb"
| 127 || August 26 || Athletics || 3-2 || Masterson (5-12) || Mazzaro (6-6) || C. Perez (16) || 11,826 || 51-76
|- style="text-align:center;" bgcolor="#bbffbb"
| 128 || August 27 || Royals || 15-4 || Tomlin (2-3) || Bullington (1-3) || || 17,631 || 52-76
|- style="text-align:center;" bgcolor="#bbffbb"
| 129 || August 28 || Royals || 4-3 (10) || C. Perez (2-2) || Chavez (5-4) || || 16,372 || 53-76
|- style="text-align:center;" bgcolor="#ffcccc"
| 130 || August 29 || Royals || 6-2 || Chen (9-7) || Carmona (11-13) || || 19,725 || 53-77
|- style="text-align:center;" bgcolor="#ffcccc"
| 131 || August 30 || White Sox || 10-6 (11) || Linebrink (2-1) || R. Perez (4-1) || || 10,663 || 53-78
|- style="text-align:center;" bgcolor="#ffcccc"
| 132 || August 31 || White Sox || 4-3 || Jackson (9-10) || Smith (1-2) || Jenks (25) || 12,006 || 53-79
|-

|- style="text-align:center;" bgcolor="ffcccc"
| 133 || September 1 || White Sox || 6-4 || Peña (4-2) || Germano (0-1) || Sale (1) || || 53-80
|- style="text-align:center;" bgcolor="bbffbb"
| 134 || September 2 || @ Mariners || 6-3 || Tomlin (3-3) || Fister (4-11) || C. Perez (17) || || 54-80
|- style="text-align:center;" bgcolor="ffcccc"
| 135 || September 3 || @ Mariners || 1-0 || French (4-4) || Carmona (11-14) || Aardsma (27) || || 54-81
|- style="text-align:center;" bgcolor="bbffbb"
| 136 || September 4 || @ Mariners || 4-2 || Talbot (9-11) || Pauly (2-7) || C. Perez (18) || || 55-81
|- style="text-align:center;" bgcolor="ffcccc"
| 137 || September 5 || @ Mariners || 3-0 || Hernández (11-10) || Gómez (3-3) || || || 55-82
|- style="text-align:center;" bgcolor="bbffbb"
| 138 || September 6 || @ Angels || 3-2 || Lewis (4-2) || Rodney (4-2) || C. Perez (19) || || 56-82
|- style="text-align:center;" bgcolor="bbffbb"
| 139 || September 7 || @ Angels || 6-1 || Masterson (6-12) || Bell (2-5) || || || 57-82
|- style="text-align:center;" bgcolor="ffcccc"
| 140 || September 8 || @ Angels || 4-3 (16) || Palmer (1-1) || Ambriz (0-2) || || || 57-83
|- style="text-align:center;" bgcolor="bbffbb"
| 141 || September 10 || Twins || 2-0 || Carmona (12-14) || Pavano (16-11) || || || 58-83
|- style="text-align:center;" bgcolor="ffcccc"
| 142 || September 11 || Twins || 1-0 (12) || Guerrier || Germano (0-2) || Capps (38) || ||  58-84
|- style="text-align:center;" bgcolor="ffcccc"
| 143 || September 12 || Twins || 6-2 || Slowey (12-6) || Talbot (9-12) || || || 58-85
|- style="text-align:center;" bgcolor="bbffbb"
| 144 || September 14 || Angels || 4-3 || Tomlin (4-3) || Kazmir (8-14) || C. Perez (20) || || 59-85
|- style="text-align:center;" bgcolor="ffcccc"
| 145 || September 15 || Angels || 7-0 || Weaver (12-11) || Gómez (3-4) || || || 59-86
|- style="text-align:center;" bgcolor="bbffbb"
| 146 || September 16	 || Angels || 3-2 (11) || R. Perez (5-1) || Cassevah (0-1) || || || 60-86
|- style="text-align:center;" bgcolor="bbffbb"
| 147 || September 17 || @ Royals || 11-4 || Carrasco (1-0) || Davies (8-10) || || || 61-86
|- style="text-align:center;" bgcolor="bbffbb"
| 148 || September 18 || @ Royals || 6-4 || Smith (2-2) || O'Sullivan (2-6) || C. Perez (21) || || 62-86
|- style="text-align:center;" bgcolor="ffcccc"
| 149 || September 19 || @ Royals || 6-4 || Hochevar (6-5) || Tomlin (4-4) || || || 62-87
|- style="text-align:center;" bgcolor="ffcccc"
| 150 || September 20 || @ Twins || 9-3 || Duensing (10-2) || Gómez (3-5) || || || 62-88
|- style="text-align:center;" bgcolor="ffcccc"
| 151 || September 21 || @ Twins || 6-4 || Perkins (1-1) || Masterson (6-13) || Capps (41) || || 62-89
|- style="text-align:center;" bgcolor="ffcccc"
| 152 || September 22 || @ Twins || 5-1 || Blackburn (10-10) || Carrasco (1-1) || || || 62-90
|- style="text-align:center;" bgcolor="ffcccc"
| 153 || September 23 || Royals || 4-2 || O'Sullivan (3-6) || Talbot (9-13) ||  Soria (41) || || 62-91
|- style="text-align:center;" bgcolor="bbffbb"
| 154 || September 24 || Royals || 7-3 || Tomlin (5-4) || Hochevar (6-6) || || || 63-91
|- style="text-align:center;" bgcolor="bbffbb"
| 155 || September 25 || Royals || 7-1 || Gómez (4-5) || Greinke (9-14) || || || 64-91
|- style="text-align:center;" bgcolor="bbffbb"
| 156 || September 26 || Royals || 5-3 || R. Perez (6-1) || Tejeda (3-5) || Pestano (1) || || 65-91
|- style="text-align:center;" bgcolor="bbffbb"
| 157 || September 27 || Tigers || 6-3 || Carrasco (2-1) || Galarraga (4-8) || C. Perez (22) || || 66-91
|- style="text-align:center;" bgcolor="#bbbbbb"
| N/A || September 28 || Tigers || colspan=6 | Postponed (rain)
|- style="text-align:center;" bgcolor="bbffbb"
| 158 || September 29 || Tigers || 4-0 || Talbot (10-13) || Scherzer (12-11) || || || 67-91
|- style="text-align:center;" bgcolor="bbffbb"
| 159 || September 29 || Tigers || 4-3 || Tomlin (6-4) || Verlander (18-9) || C. Perez (23) || ||
|- style="text-align:center;" bgcolor="bbffbb"
| 160 || October 1 || @ White Sox || 7-3 || Carmona (13-14) || Peña (5-3) || || || 69-91
|- style="text-align:center;" bgcolor="ffcccc"
| 161 || October 2 || @ White Sox || 6-2 || Buehrle (13-13) || Carrasco (2-2) || || || 69-92
|- style="text-align:center;" bgcolor="ffcccc"
| 162 || October 3 || @ White Sox || 6-5 || Jackson (10-12) || Germano''' (0-3) || Sale (4) || || 69-93
|-

Player stats

BattingNote: G = Games played; AB = At bats; R = Runs scored; H = Hits; 2B = Doubles; 3B = Triples; HR = Home runs; RBI = Runs batted in; AVG = Batting average; SB = Stolen basesPitchingNote: W = Wins; L = Losses; ERA = Earned run average; G = Games pitched; GS = Games started; SV = Saves; IP = Innings pitched; H = Hits allowed; R = Runs allowed; ER = Earned runs allowed; BB = Walks allowed; K = StrikeoutsFarm system

LEAGUE CHAMPIONS: Columbus, Lake County

Notes

External links

2010 Cleveland Indians Season Official Site
2010 Cleveland Indians season at Baseball Reference''
Fausto Carmona selected as an All Star

Cleveland Indians
Cleveland Guardians seasons
Cleve